Athanasios Staikos (born 29 November 1980) is a Greek professional football manager and former player, who is the current manager of Super League club PAS Giannina.

References

1980 births
Living people
Greek footballers
Kalamata F.C. players
Greek football managers
PAS Giannina F.C. managers
Association football midfielders
People from Epidaurus